, English title: The Swishing Sword a.k.a. Human Skin Peacock, is a 1958 Japanese film directed by Kazuo Mori.

Cast 

 Fujiko Yamamoto
 Raizo Ichikawa as Shinpachiro Nasu
 Shoji Umewaka
 Seizaburo Kozo
 Mieko Kondo
 Sonisuke Samawara

References

External links 
  http://www.raizofan.net/link4/movie3/kujyaku.htm
 

1958 films
Films directed by Kazuo Mori
Daiei Film films
1950s Japanese films